This article is about music-related events in 1865.

Events
January 1 – Hector Berlioz completes his Memoirs.
April 20 – Crosby's Opera House (Chicago, Illinois) opens
April 28 – Giacomo Meyerbeer's opera L'Africaine is premiered in Paris at the Grand Opéra, after the composer's death.
June 10 – Richard Wagner's opera Tristan und Isolde debuts in Munich at the Königliches Hof- und Nationaltheater.
September 9 – Franz von Suppé's operetta Die schöne Galathee debuts in Vienna's Carl-Theater.
September 11 – Johann Strauss II conducts a performance of 'Characteristic Dances' by Peter Tchaikovsky at Pavlovsk Park. It is the first public performance of Tchaikovsky's music. The piece would later become the 'Dances of the Hay Maidens', in The Voyevoda. 
December 17 – Franz Schubert's Unfinished Symphony debuts in Vienna, 43 years after of its composition.
Philipp Scharwenka relocates to Berlin.
Joseph Parry is admitted to the Gorsedd of bards at the National Eisteddfod of Wales.

Published popular songs
 "Follow the Flag" m. John Rogers Thomas
 "Jeff in Pettycoats" by Henry Tucker
 "Marching Through Georgia" w.m. Henry Clay Work
 "Roll, Jordan, Roll" traditional spiritual
 "The Ship That Never Returned" w.m. Henry Clay Work

Classical music
Elfrida Andrée – Piano Quintet in E minor
Antonio Bazzini – String Quartet in F major
Johannes Brahms
Piano Quintet, Op.34
String Sextet No. 2 Op. 36
Cello Sonata No. 1 Op. 38
Sixteen Waltzes, Op. 39
Trio for violin, horn and piano Op. 40
Anton Bruckner 
Military March in E-flat major, WAB 116
Trauungschor ("Wedding chorus")
Hans von Bulow – 3 Valses caractéristiques, Op.18
Felix Draeseke – Lacrimosa
Antonín Dvořák
Cello concerto No. 1 in A major (later reconstructed by Günter Raphael,
Symphony No. 1 (The Bells of Zlonice) and later by Jarmil Burghauser)
Symphony No. 2
Gabriel Fauré – Cantique de Jean Racine
César Franck – Quare fremuerunt gentes
Herman Goetz – Sonata for Piano (Four Hands), Op.17
Carl Goldmark – Sakuntala, Op.13
Edvard Grieg
Piano sonata Op. 7 in E minor
Violin sonata No. 1 Op. 8
Franz Liszt – Missa Choralis
Jules Massenet – Suite No.1, Op.13
Modest Mussorgsky 
Prayer, Op.5
Cradle Song, Op.16
Memories of Childhood
Nikolai Rimsky-Korsakov – Symphony No. 1
Camille Saint-Saëns – Serenade in E flat major, Op. 15
Pablo de Sarasate – Souvenirs de Faust
Johan Svendsen
String Quartet, Op. 1
2 Songs (Male Chorus), Op. 2
Pyotr Ilyich Tchaikovsky
Overture in F major
Piano Sonata in C-sharp minor
Quartet Movement in B-flat major
Henri Wieniawski – Fantasia on Themes from 'Faust', Op.20

Opera
François Bazin – Le voyage en Chine
Giacomo Meyerbeer – L'Africaine
Stanislaw Moniuszko – The Haunted Manor
Camille Saint-Saëns – Le timbre d'argent
Richard Wagner – Tristan und Isolde

Musical theater
 Orpheus In The Underworld, London production opened at Her Majesty's Theatre on December 26 and ran for 76 performances

Births
 May 9 – August de Boeck, Belgium Composer (d. 1937)
 June 9
Carl Nielsen, composer (d. 1931)
Albéric Magnard, composer (d. 1914)
June 13 – William Butler Yeats, lyricist (died 1939)
June 14 – Auguste Sérieyx, composer (died 1949)
July 8 – Rita Strohl, composer (died 1941)
 July 21 – Robert Kahn, composer (d. 1951)
 August 10 – Alexander Glazunov, composer (d. 1936)
 October 1 – Paul Dukas, composer (d. 1935)
 October 15 – Charles W. Clark, American baritone (d. 1925)
 December 3 – Gustav Jenner, composer (d. 1920)
 December 8 – Jean Sibelius, composer (d. 1957)
 December 25 – Fay Templeton, US singer and actress

Deaths
January 23 – Josef Leopold Zvonař, composer and music critic (b. 1824)
January 27 – Giuseppe Rocca, violin maker (b. 1807)
January 28 – Felice Romani, librettist for Donizetti and Bellini (b. 1788)
February 20 – Pierre-Louis Dietsch, French composer and conductor (b. 1808)
April 1 – Giuditta Pasta, operatic soprano (b. 1797)
April 2 – John Cassell, music publisher (born 1817)
August 1 – François Xavier Bazin, bow-maker (b. 1824) (cholera)
September 10 – George Linley, poet and composer (b. 1798)
October 8 – Heinrich Wilhelm Ernst, violinist and composer (b. 1814)
October 12 – William Vincent Wallace, composer (b. 1812)
December 6 – Sebastián Iradier, composer (b. 1809)
December 18 – Francisco Manuel da Silva, songwriter and music professor (b. 1795)

Notes

References

 
19th century in music
Music by year